Diospyros lateralis is a tree in the family Ebenaceae. Inflorescences bear up to three flowers. The specific epithet  is from the Latin meaning "lateral", referring to the position of the inflorescences on the stem. Habitat is lowland mixed dipterocarp forests. D. lateralis is found in Thailand, Sumatra and Borneo.

References

lateralis
Plants described in 1873
Trees of Thailand
Trees of Sumatra
Trees of Borneo